Cutting Through Spiritual Materialism, by Chögyam Trungpa is a book addressing many common pitfalls of self-deception in seeking spirituality, which the author coins as Spiritual materialism. It is the transcript of two series of lectures given by Trungpa Rinpoche in 1970–71.

In Psychology Today Michael J. Formica writes,
As soon as we cast something into a role, as soon as we put a label on it, as soon as we name it and give it life by virtue of our investment (read: ego), we take away all its power and it is nothing more than an event – it is no longer a spiritual revelation, but simply a material experience. That is spiritual materialism at its peak.

References

External links
Glossary of Shambhala terms

Books about Buddhism
Literature about spirituality
Self-help books
Shambhala Publications books